KA Commuter line Duri–Tangerang, or the Tangerang line, is a commuter rail line in Indonesia, operated by PT Kereta Commuter Indonesia (KCI). The line operate on the Duri–Tangerang segment, which connects Duri station in West Jakarta and Tangerang station in Tangerang City, Banten. On maps and diagrams, the line is shown using the colour "brown".

Stations 
The distance table of Commuterline stations.

Rolling stock 
Current
JR East 205 series
Tokyo Metro 6000 series
INKA-Bombardier EMU (for SHA Rail Link)
Tokyu  8000/8500 series

Former rolling stock
Toyo Rapid 1000 series

Accidents and incidents

Pre-2011 route and services reform 

 19 August 2000, a KRL Hitachi trainset running KA 628 (Economy class) from Jakarta Kota to Tangerang was hit from behind by Indocement coal train no. KA 228 en route between Kampung Bandan and Angke stations. Three people died on this accident including two train crews on both trains. The Hitachi train involved was stored for a long time afterward, before being scrapped. On a further note, this line used to continue from Duri all the way to Kota before 2011.

References

External links 
 KRL Jabotabek website 
 Jabotabek Railnews 
 KRL Jabodetabek 
 KRL-Mania – KRL Jabotabek community site 

Duri
Infrastructure in Indonesia
Transport in Jakarta
Transport in Banten